William Branson may refer to:
 William Henry Branson (1887–1961), American minister
 William Hoban Branson (1938–2006), American economist
 William Branson (physician) (1874–1950), British physician and author